Jarjnaz  is a Syrian town located in Maarrat al-Nu'man Nahiyah in Maarrat al-Nu'man District, Idlib.  According to the Syria Central Bureau of Statistics (CBS), Jarjnaz had a population of 10,756 in the 2004 census.

References 

Populated places in Maarat al-Numan District